The 2011 ASB Chatham Cup is New Zealand's 84th knockout football competition.

The 2011 competition had a preliminary round, a qualification round, and four rounds proper before quarter-finals, semi-finals, and a final. Competition was run in three regions (northern, central, southern) until the quarter-finals, from which stage the draw was open. In all, 120 teams entered the competition.

The 2011 final
With both finalists coming from the lower North Island, it was decided by NZF to hold the final at a neutral venue in the same part of the country. As such, Palmerston North's Memorial Park played host to the final for the first time.

The final was played in front of a crowd of some 3,000 spectators. Underdogs Wairarapa won the final largely through their Pacific Island combination of Seule Soromon and Pita Rabo. They took the lead in the 24th minute after a period of pressure,  when striker Soromon latched onto a cross from right winger Dale Higham, heading the ball past Hawke's Bay goalkeeper Shaun Peta. Early in the second half, Wairarapa failed to double the lead, when a penalty taken by their captain Adam Cowan hit the woodwork. Napier came back strongly, scoring an equaliser through Fergus Neil in the 67th minute. From this point, however, the game was largely under Wairarapa's control, and a late goal from Rabo secured the win.

The Jack Batty Memorial Cup for the final's most valuable player was awarded to Wairarapa's Scott Robinson.

Results

Second round

* Won on penalties by Manurewa (5-4) and Western (4-1)

Central United, East Coast Bays, Melville United, Onehunga Sports, and Three Kings United received byes to the Third Round.

Third round

Fourth round

Quarter-finals

* Won on penalties by Bay Olympic (5-3)

Semi-finals

Final

References

 NZ Football 2011 Chatham Cup full results
 Sporting Pulse 2011 Chatham Cup page
 Photographs from the final

Chatham Cup
Chatham Cup
Chatham Cup
Chat